Ori Comay (born October 21, 1996), better known by his stage name and parody character Dudu Faruk is an Israeli rapper, singer and actor. His musical style is trap integrated with mizrahi music. The lyrics of his songs discuss violence and sexuality explicitly.

Early life 
Comay grew up in the neighborhood of Ma'oz Aviv in the north of Tel Aviv. He attended the multidisciplinary school Lady Davis in Ne'ot Afeka.

Biography 
Comay created the "Dudu Faruk" character during his time in high school in 2013 as a parody Instagram account. His character started getting attention in 2017.

Faruk wears clothing commonly associated with an ars, usually a white tank top and baseball cap.

Faruk received negative reactions following his songs' explicit lyrics. The chairwoman of the Women's International Zionist Organization in Israel, Gila Oshrat, formally requested from Hadera mayor, Zvi Gendelman, and from then minister of Culture and Sports, Miri Regev, to cancel Faruk's show at the Boom Box Festival.

Discography

Studio albums 
Osef Hachashmal (2018)
Shhh... (2021)

References 

Israeli rappers
Israeli male television actors
21st-century Israeli male singers
1996 births
Living people
Pseudonymous artists
People from Tel Aviv